Vamshodharaka is a 2015 Indian Kannada language family drama film directed by Aditya Chikkanna and produced by actor Aravind Rathasapthami. The film stars Vijay Raghavendra and Meghana Raj pairing up for the first time in lead roles.

Reported to be a rural family entertainer, the principal photography of the film began in October 2014. The film released on 6 November 2015.

Cast
 Vijay Raghavendra as Vishwa
 Meghana Raj
 Naveen Krishna
 Rangayana Raghu
 Sadhu Kokila
 Lakshmi
 Vinaya Prasad
 Srinivasa Murthy
 Dingri Nagaraj
 Sathyajit
 Biradar
 Sanket Kashi
 Veena Sunder

Soundtrack

The music for the film and soundtracks are composed by V. Manohar. The album has five soundtracks.

References

External links
Vamshodharaka Updates

2015 films
2010s Kannada-language films
Indian drama films
Films scored by V. Manohar